Kim Bon-Kwang (born 30 September 1988) is a South Korean footballer who plays as midfielder for Suwon FC in K League Challenge.

Career
He was selected by Jeju United in the 2010 K-League draft but made no appearance in Jeju. He moved to Cheonan City after the 2010 season.

He joined Suwon FC after a trial basis in June 2013.

References

External links 

1988 births
Living people
Association football forwards
South Korean footballers
Jeju United FC players
Suwon FC players
K League 1 players
Korea National League players
K League 2 players
Association football midfielders